Večići is a village in the Bosnia and Herzegovina, Kotor Varoš municipality of the Republika Srpska region in northwestern Bosnia and Herzegovina. It spread at Večićko polje (Večići's field), nearby the mouth of Cvrcka (in Vrbanja river).

Its population was reported to be 300 people in 2009, all of whom were Muslims. In 1992 there were 1,110. The narrower region is mainly populated by Serb people.

During the Bosnian War, the village was a pocket of Bosniak resistance against the Bosnian Serb forces of Ratko Mladic. It suffered severe damage at the hands of the Mladic forces, including destruction of the village mosque. In the aftermath of war, the American Refugee Committee organised construction of some new housing in the village and the government was attempting to encourage resettlement of the minority Muslim community in the area. The anthropologist Madelyn Iris noted that "No home had been left undamaged, and no extended family had been left entirely intact." Some of the villagers had died in a massacre at nearby Grabovica in November 1992 and 150 men and boys were killed in the village itself in the same month.

Population

See also 
 Cvrcka
 Vrbanjci

References

External links 
Photographs of Večići

Villages in Bosnia and Herzegovina
Villages in Republika Srpska
Populated places in Kotor Varoš